The Pandaloidea are a superfamily of shrimp, comprising the large family Pandalidae (about 200 species) and the much smaller Chlorotocellidae (seven species).

References

Caridea
Arthropod superfamilies